Black Male Studies (BMS), also known as Black Men's Studies, Black Masculinist Studies, African American Male Studies, and African American Men's Studies, is an area of study within the interdisciplinary field of Black studies that primarily focuses on the study of Black men and boys. Its research focus includes the study of Black manhood and Black masculinity, and it draws from disciplines such as history, philosophy, and sociology.

Overview

Black Male Studies primarily focuses on the study of Black men and boys. Its research focus includes the study of Black manhood and Black masculinity, and it draws from disciplines such as history, philosophy, and sociology. Black Male Studies uses a Black male-centered paradigm designed to critique past and present gender studies publications on Black males as well as centers and contends with the problem of anti-Black misandry (“disdain for Black men and boys”). Past and present gender studies publications tend to carry assumptions of Black men and boys being criminals and assailants of Black women and white women. Consequently, past and present gender studies publications tend to contain paradigms, theories, and narratives that are grounded in anti-Black misandry, along with a theoretically constructed language of hypermasculinity, and tend to be ill-equipped at understanding Black males as victims. The past and present vulnerability of Black males, ranging from rape, to sexual abuse, to death, which tends to be overlooked and downplayed by rhetoric about hypermasculinity, underscores the need to develop new language, narratives, and theories for understanding Black males.

The prescribed goal for Black Male Studies is to advance the study of Black males of all ages, beyond the scope of Black male stereotypes, and humanize the theoretical accounts of Black males; its prescribed research focus includes creativity, intellect, and the health of Black males of all ages as well the socialization of adult Black males as it relates to family, fatherhood, and positive relations with their children, and the social and psychological methods of coping used by Black males. Black Male Studies also seeks to liberate Black males from the gender teleology that has been set upon them. Additionally, Black Male Studies seeks to provide counternarratives to hegemonic narratives about Black males; these counternarratives include highlighting the victimization of Black males, which operates counter to hegemonic narratives that pathologically imagine and depict Black male as agents of their own racial discrimination and socioeconomic isolation. Furthermore, Black Male Studies seeks to correct these distorted narratives about Black males through empirical testing and theory development as well as uses the lived experiences and voices of Black males to counter these narratives about Black males.

History

Richard Majors, who was an Afro-psychologist, is attributed with creating African American Male Studies in 1991. Sailes (2017) attributed its creation to Majors and described it as being a “line of scholarly inquiry.”

In 1992, J. Billson and R. Majors developed the cool pose theory.

In 1998, Harold Mason developed an empirical community college persistence model for African American males.

In 2010, S. R. Harper developed the anti-deficit achievement paradigm.

In 2013, E. C. Bush and L. Bush developed the African American male theory.

On October 7, 2015, the 4th Annual International Colloquium on Black Males in Education was hosted in Mona, Jamaica, at the University of the West Indies. At the colloquium, Marcus Johnson, Darren D. Kelly, Alvin Logan, Leonard N. Moore, Ryan Sutton, and Gregory J. Vincent, from the University of Texas's African American Male Research Initiative, participated in a panel titled, "New Directions in Black Male Studies: The University of Texas at Austin African American Male Research Initiative."

Through the authoring of Tommy J. Curry's The Man-Not: Race, Class, Genre, and the Dilemmas of Black Manhood (2017), the theoretical foundations for and the necessity of Black Male Studies as a distinct area of study was shown, the presence of Black Male Studies in philosophy was made known, and the necessity for its multidisciplinary focus on topics such as class, law, masculinity, politics, and race were shown. Killing Boogeymen: Phallicism and The Misandric Mischaracterization of Black Males in Theory (2018) was another foundational work for Black Male Studies that was authored by Curry. Both of these academic works have contributed to the ontological foundation of Black Male Studies. Due to how significant these works have been to Black Male Studies, Rasheed (2019) indicated that Curry could be considered the Father of Black Male Studies. However, Rasheed (2019) also indicated that numerous scholars from inside and outside of academia contributed to the foundations of Black Male Studies.

On October 4, 2017, the 6th Annual International Colloquium on Black Males in Education was hosted in Toronto, Canada. At the colloquium, Tommy J. Curry, William A. Smith, and Alford Young participated in a panel titled, "The Man-Not as Paradigm: Black Male Studies and the Reimagining of the Black Male in Theory and Educational Praxis."

In 2019, Tommy J. Curry became the editor for the book series, Black Male Studies: A Series Exploring the Paradoxes of Racially Subjugated Males. The book series was the first of its kind at the Temple University Press to focus on the study of Black males. The book series was also grounded in the post-intersectional paradigms of global South masculinities and social dominance theory, sought to address the existing shortcomings in masculinity studies publications, and aspired toward the development of empirically established theorization in Black Male Studies.

On March 25, 2022, the 12th Annual Lemon Project Spring Symposium was hosted at the College of William and Mary in Williamsburg, Virginia. At the symposium, Daniel Black, O’Shan Gadsden, and T. Hasan Johnson participated in a panel titled, "The Time is Now: The Lives of Black Men Past, Present, and Future." Tommy J. Curry was also a keynote speaker at the symposium.

Black Male Studies and the Western World

Black Male Studies seeks to have a re-evaluation of the body of work on the maleness, manhood, and masculinity of Black males and their role in relation to white patriarchy in Canada, the United Kingdom, the United States, and in other locations around the world.

United States of America

The system within the United States of America, which excludes, otherizes, ostracizes, and discriminates against Black males on the basis of race and sex, is grounded in a history of pathologized, prejudiced caricatures of Black people, and in particular, caricatures and views of Black males as being threats to the political and socioeconomic dominance and power of white males. During the 19th century, the heteropatriarchal norms of family structure and society limited political and socioeconomic dominance and power to the realms of white manhood; the caricature of Black males as maliciously violent, animalistic brutes derives from this 19th century environment. Through Black Male Studies, white women suffragists have been shown to be influential in the expansion of the power of white patriarchy through their advocating for the mass lynching of Black males and through the demonization of Black males so as to affect their right to vote. Susan B. Anthony and Elizabeth Cady Stanton are examples of white suffragettes who sought to advance the patriarchy of white men. In addition to promoting racial unity among whites during the mid-19th century, white women sought, through various means (e.g., establishing Ku Klux Klan branches, joining citizens councils, public campaigns), to reinforce the system of segregation and disenfranchise Black men amid the first half of the 20th century. Through the political and scholarly efforts of white feminists amid the 1970s, impoverished Black men were portrayed as violent, crime-prone, rapists that required imprisonment to defend the social order and Black militancy was portrayed as a danger to the womanhood of white women. In spite of this documented history between Black males and white women, and criticism of the ahistoric image of white women having occurred since the 1960s, the image of white women has remained one of being "politically liberal, socially progressive, and peaceful."

Within the patriarchal social order and racial caste system of the southern United States, the severity of punishment for violations of this social order was greater for Black males than Black females. Amid slavery and Jim Crow segregation, Black males of all ages were enslaved, lynched, and raped by white men and white women. Jim Crow laws, segregation, and economic policies of the capitalist system were used to oppress and discriminate against Black males as well as deny Black males means of and opportunities for self-actualization of their manhood; in addition to being due to sexualized racism, this was also due to anti-Black misandry, which is defined as “an exaggerated pathological aversion toward Black boys and men, created and strengthened in societal, structural, and institutional ideologies.”

Through the lens of social dominance theory, Black males are understood to be out-group males who are subordinated by and through the hegemonic system of in-group white males; this dynamic is particularly exacerbated as it relates to material resources and symbolic group boundaries. The constructed narrative around out-group Black males increasingly shifts toward one of Black males being sexual threats to the endogamous outcomes of white people as economic abundance increases.

Black Male Studies, Feminism, and Intersectionality

In the 1960s and 1970s, white feminists and racist specialists in criminology developed gender theories that are grounded in racist constructions of Black manhood as imitations of white manhood; these theories continue to be used by intersectionality. Despite decades of use, evidence has not been produced to support these theories, which, thereby, shows the theories as being mainly grounded in ideology and ideological assumptions. In particular, the theories are grounded in ideological assumptions, such as Black males having incomplete identities, who then have ideological narratives that create caricatures of Black males from these assumed incomplete identities.

Through theory and framework development, as well as academic consensus, the anti-Black misandry reflected in broader society remains enshrined in academia. Anti-Black misandry, such as “the cumulative assertions of Black male inferiority due to errant psychologies of lack, dispositions of deviance, or hyper-personality traits (e.g., hyper-sexuality, hyper-masculinity) which rationalize the criminalization, phobics, and sanctioning of Black male life” and the “hatred, fear, and negation of Black males”, have become foundational axioms and paradigms for academic literature and theories in feminism and intersectionality. Despite some feminists having presented empirical evidence that refutes these theories, the re-development of these critiqued axioms and paradigms of feminism and intersectionality has not occurred.

The characterization of Black males as patriarchs who are committed to dominance is constructed by a psychologism for intersectionality that remains unchallenged; this characterization, along with the assumption of male privilege being attributable to Black males, in relation to evidence of Black males as being out-group males, has resulted in it being identified as “intersectionality’s Black male problem.” Consequently, what has been sought in Black Male Studies is for the portrayal of white patriarchy providing benefits to the masculinity of Black males to be re-evaluated. While intersectionality tends to ideologically emphasize imitation and criminality in relation to Black manhood, there is considerable empirical evidence that highlights Black manhood as being “positive, functional, and humanist.” However, this evidence has not been factored into the theorization of intersectionality.

Black Male Studies seeks to reveal the ideological determinism embedded within present gender frameworks. Additionally, as a result of what is revealed, Black Male Studies also seeks to liberate Black males from this deterministic lens that views Black males as objects rather than subjects. Further, Black Male Studies reveals the position of Black males within analyses rooted in intersectionality, which are grounded in assumptions from feminism that present subculture-of-violence reasoning about Black males and outdated, pseudoscientific assumptions from racist criminology that are repackaged as being state-of-the-art theory and presented as advancement within the field of gender studies. Due to intersectional feminism's use of enduring negative criminological generalizations about Black males, which do not cohere to existing empirical evidence on the egalitarian views of Black men toward Black women and intimate partner violence, and this evidence suggesting otherwise, this has resulted in Golden (2022) characterizing it as "theoretical dehumanization." Curry (2022) adds:

The vacuity of Black-maleness demands it to take on any number of sex-based racial caricatures thereby exceeding the present modes of being described by gender. Throughout American history, the Black male has been defined in contradictory terms. He is raped and rapist, hyper-masculine and effeminate, hyper-sexual, and homosexual. The simultaneity of various negations imposed on one body even when in stark contradiction is of primary analytic interest to the Black Male Studies scholar. These non-sensical negations indicate the accumulation of violence that makes the disposability and death of Black males so necessary to the illusion of a thriving civil society. This liminality of the Black male borders civil society primarily through violence—as a horizon of death. This perspective has not been accurately captured by the contemporary theoretical accounts of gender and masculinity circulating within Black feminist theory or intersectionality’s depictions of various Black subjectivities. Black Male Studies argues that Black males, like other racialized male groups throughout the Global South, are the primary targets of patriarchal violence. Being confined to an outgroup male status, what I have previously been referred to as Man-Not-ness, is an indeterminate and fungible position in Western patriarchal societies that serve as the depository of negative caricatures that constitute that which is outside and threatens to doom civilization—all that is savage, barbarous; or the heinous threat to Man.

Oluwayomi (2020) cites bell hooks', We Real Cool, as an example of academic literature that uses intersectionality to pathologically characterize Black males, and yet, does so without use of empirical data or facts to justify the characterization. Oluwayomi (2020) indicates that "intersectionality and other Black feminist theories" describe "Black males as what they are not—the man-not." Despite being empirically established, the gendercide of Black males has largely gone overlooked in related fields of study.

Theory of Phallicism

Curry (2018) explains:

Phallicism refers to the condition by which males of a subordinated racialized or ethnicized group are simultaneously imagined to be a sexual threat and predatory, and libidinally constituted as sexually desirous by the fantasies or fetishes of the dominant racial group. This concept is meant to guide a seemingly inexplicable tension if not contradiction between the description of racialized males under repressive and murderous regimes and their hyper-sexualization as objects of desire, possession, and want. The racialized male is conceptualized as the substantive (social) meaning of rape, while simultaneously being subjugated to rape by both the male and female members of the dominant group who disown their sexual violence because the hypervisibility of the racialized male is only as the rapist.

The concept of the subordinate male target, which is a concept in social dominance theory, serves as the basis for the concept of the racialized male. The concept of the racialized male is central to the theory of phallicism. Tommy J. Curry's scholarship on sexually vulnerable, racialized males in Black Male Studies has also contributed to the scholarship in Holocaust Studies.

Black Male Studies and Black Male Education

Black PlayCrit is grounded in the paradigm used in Black Male Studies as it allows for an understanding of how gendered and racial violence are imposed on the activity of play for Black boys. Black PlayCrit adds to the contributions of Critical Race Theory, Black Critical Theory, and Black Male Studies by progressing beyond the theoretically constructed language of hypermasculinity and by being theoretically capable of taking into account the racialized and gendered mistreatment of Black boys as well as the victimization and vulnerability of Black boys. Due to the racial theorization of Critical Race Theory not particularly addressing the problem of anti-Blackness, which is distinct from White supremacy, Black Critical Theory particularly addresses the problem of anti-Blackness through the construction and framing of ideas and language to describe it in the lives of Black people as well as the development of counternarratives. Black PlayCrit utilizes the following tentative notions, which, as Bryan (2020) indicates, are still under development: "(a) The idea of Play-Not is endemic to Black boys’ play experiences; (b) the idea of the Play-Past/Play-Present and Future nexus makes explicit connections to past, present, and future acts of antimisandric violence in Black boys’ play; and (c) the idea of the public pedagogy of Black boyhood play serves as concept and pedagogy which challenge anti-Black misandry in Black boys’ play." 

Bryan (2020) defined Black PlayCrit Literacies "as a multiplicity of Black texts that highlight and celebrate the beauty, diversity, and positive contributions of Black boys through play." BlackBoyCrit Pedagogy adds to Black PlayCrit Literacies by addressing the manifold problems (e.g., emotional, psychological, pedagogical) that affect Black boys during their early period of schooling. BlackBoyCrit Pedagogy also derives its direction and basis from Black Critical Theory (BlackCrit) and Black Male Studies. BlackBoyCrit Pedagogy has been constructed to emphasize the importance of Black male teachers and Black boys, both during the early period of schooling and outside of it.

The research method of Black Male Studies is one of the research methods used in Black Male Literacy Education. A continuous pattern found throughout academic works from Black Male Studies is Black male accounts of experiencing Racial Battle Fatigue, which is defined as "the physical and psychological toll taken due to constant and unceasing discrimination, micro-aggressions, and stereotype threat." Consequently, many Black males "suffer from forms of generalized anxiety manifested by both physical and emotional symptom." Black male literacy development also corresponds with this pattern of Racial Battle Fatigue.

More Postsecondary models and theories are needed to further develop the theoretical canon for Black Male Studies.

Universities and colleges with Black Male Studies programs and courses

 Bowdoin College
 California State University, Fresno
 California State University, Los Angeles
 Lane Community College
 University of Edinburgh

Academics in Black Male Studies

 Quaylan Allen
 Taharka Anderson
 Daniel Black
 Derrick R. Brooms
 Edward C. Bush
 Lawson Bush, V
 Gwenetta Curry
 Tommy J. Curry, Personal Chair of Africana Philosophy and Black Male Studies
 Darrius Hills
 Tyrone Howard
 John L. Hudgins
 Amir Jaima
 T. Hasan Johnson
 Ricky L. Jones
 Serie McDougal, III
 Seulghee Lee
 Adebayo Ogungbure
 Theodore S. Ransaw
 Lawrence Rasheed
 Dalitso Ruwe
 John N. Singer
 Damariyé L. Smith
 Makonnen Tendaji
 Uwazi Zamani

Scholarly and academic journals

 Black Male Studies: A Series Exploring the Paradoxes of Racially Subjugated Males
 Journal of African American Male Studies
 Journal of African American Males in Education
 Journal of African American Men

References

African diaspora
African studies
Men's studies
Black studies
African-American society
African-American culture
Pan-Africanism
Postmodernism